The Vojko Herksel Cup was an annual basketball club competition held between 2006 and 2010. The last Vojko Herksel Cup season was held during 2010. The cup is 2007 renamed in honor of the former director Adriatic League Vojko Herksel, who died in 2007, which contributed to the development of women's basketball.

Finals

Champions

See also
 WABA League

References

 
2006 establishments in Europe
2010 disestablishments in Europe
International club basketball competitions
Defunct women's basketball cup competitions in Europe
WABA League
Herksel